Gerard Johannes "Sacco" van der Made (4 April 1918, Rotterdam – 21 December 1997, Rotterdam) was a Dutch actor. He provided the voice of Scrooge McDuck in the Dutch version in the television show DuckTales. His last big TV role was that of Bert Jansen in the comedy show Het zonnetje in huis, the Dutch version of Tom, Dick and Harriet. His last role was that of Gerard Krol in the crime series Baantjer. He died  at the age of 79 and is buried at a general burial site in Nisse.

Family
His son, Guus van der Made, is a TV producer who has worked on Het zonnetje in huis.

His brother, Jan van der Made, was a writer and a member of the NSB. He died in 1981.

Filmography

References

External links

 

1918 births
1997 deaths
Actors from Rotterdam
Dutch male television actors
Dutch male voice actors
20th-century Dutch male actors